The 2011 Goldwater Women's Tennis Classic was a professional tennis tournament played on hard courts. It was the third edition of the tournament which was part of the 2011 ITF Women's Circuit. It took place in Phoenix, Arizona, United States between 7 and 13 November 2011.

WTA entrants

Seeds

 1 Rankings are as of October 31, 2011.

Other entrants
The following players received wildcards into the singles main draw:
  Gail Brodsky
  Victoria Duval
  June Lee

The following players received entry from the qualifying draw:
  Elena Bovina
  Krista Hardebeck
  Grace Min
  Yasmin Schnack

Champions

Singles

 Sesil Karatantcheva def.  Michelle Larcher de Brito, 6–1, 7–5

Doubles

 Jamie Hampton /  Ajla Tomljanović def.  Maria Sanchez /  Yasmin Schnack, 3–6, 6–3, [10–6]

External links
Official Website
ITF Search 

Goldwater Women's Tennis Classic
Hard court tennis tournaments in the United States
Goldwater Women's Tennis Classic
Goldwater Women's Tennis Classic
Goldwater Women's Tennis Classic
Tennis tournaments in Arizona